A flatline is an electrical time sequence measurement that shows no activity and therefore, when represented, shows a flat line instead of a moving one. It almost always refers to either a flatlined electrocardiogram, where the heart shows no electrical activity (asystole), or to a flat electroencephalogram, in which the brain shows no electrical activity (brain death). Both of these specific cases are involved in various definitions of death.

Cardiac flatline

A cardiac flatline is also called asystole. It can possibly be generated by malfunction of the electrocardiography device, but it is recommended to first rule out true asystole because of the emergence of such condition.

When a patient displays a cardiac flatline, the treatment of choice is cardiopulmonary resuscitation and injection of vasopressin (epinephrine and atropine are also possibilities). Successful resuscitation is generally unlikely and is inversely related to the length of time spent attempting resuscitation. Defibrillation, which can be used for other causes of cardiac arrests, is not recommended, despite commonly appearing on medical dramas as a remedy for asystole.

References

Cardiac electrophysiology
Medical tests
Signs of death